KTGW (91.7 FM) is a Christian radio station licensed to Fruitland, New Mexico, serving the Farmington, New Mexico Area. The station is owned by Native American Christian Voice, Inc.

References

External links
KTGW's official website
 

TGW
Native American Christianity
Farmington, New Mexico
Native American radio